Lyngør Lighthouse is a coastal lighthouse located on the island of Kjeholmen in the Lyngør area in the municipality of Tvedestrand in Agder county, Norway. The lighthouse was established in 1879, and was listed as a protected site in 1997. It was automated in 2004, so no one is stationed there any longer.

Specifications
The light has an original 3rd order Fresnel lens on the original rotating mechanism and it shines at an intensity of 59,100 candela and the flash shines at an intensity of 616,500 candela. The facility is only accessible by boat, but the site is open to the public, and the keeper's house and tower are open as well, in fact, the building can be rented out for overnight accommodations.

Media gallery

See also

Lighthouses in Norway
List of lighthouses in Norway

References

External links
 Norsk Fyrhistorisk Forening 

Lighthouses completed in 1879
Lighthouses in Agder
Listed lighthouses in Norway
Tvedestrand